William Victor James Rudd (27 February 1894 – 23 July 1961) was an Australian rules footballer who played with Richmond in the Victorian Football League (VFL).
Billy served in WW1, in the 6th Battalion (Australia), and was discharged from the war in 1916, after being shot in the chest. His short football career with the Richmond Football Club only lasted two years.

Notes

External links 

1894 births
1961 deaths
Australian rules footballers from Victoria (Australia)
Richmond Football Club players
South Yarra Football Club players
Port Melbourne Football Club players